The Mississippi Gulf Coast National Heritage Area is a federally designated National Heritage Area along the Gulf coast of Mississippi. The designated area of the Mississippi Gulf Coast comprises six counties recognized for their unique cultural and scenic qualities. The National Heritage Area designation provides a unified marketing and promotional framework for the region.

The National Heritage Area comprises Pearl River, Stone, George, Hancock, Harrison and Jackson counties. It includes the Mississippi portion of Gulf Islands National Seashore.

The area was devastated by Hurricane Katrina in 2005.  Much of the national heritage area's efforts since that time have focused on recovery and preservation and restoration of buildings and cultural resources damaged or lost in the storm.

The Mississippi Gulf Coast National Heritage Area was established in December 2004 by Public Law 108-447.

References

External links
 Mississippi Gulf Coast National Heritage Area official site

National Heritage Areas of the United States
Protected areas established in 2004
2004 establishments in Mississippi
Gulf Islands National Seashore
Protected areas of Pearl River County, Mississippi
Protected areas of Stone County, Mississippi
Protected areas of George County, Mississippi
Protected areas of Hancock County, Mississippi
Protected areas of Jackson County, Mississippi